Manali Jagtap (born in 1978, Kolhapur , India) is a multi-award winning designer and a political artist.  She lives and works in Malta, India and the UK.

Manali was recognised as one of the Top 10 Indian Women Leaders in Europe by Women Entrepreneur India magazine in 2022. 

In 2017, she was invited to lead the visual art project for the ŻiguŻajg International Arts Festival for Children & Young People in Malta, which saw 10,000 school children leave wishes for others.

Her audio visual project, He Can Read, He Can Write and He Can Shoot was shown at the Blitz Contemporary Art Gallery as part of the exhibition, Truth | Lies (2017), that tackled themes that are both hugely metaphysical as well as specific to the current political and media zeitgeist, as alluded to in the exhibition’s overarching desire to tackle phenomena like ‘fake news’.  This project was also shown at the Deptford X in 2010.

Other works include human rights in story-telling (Gagado's Ancient Tales in collaboration with Burmese artist, Htein Lin), and the politics of food (The Mahatma Thal), Doodle Series as part of the Telegraph Hill Festival, Bleaching Identities, an ongoing investigation into the culture of skin-whitening in Asia, Africa and the Middle East, at Hart Lanes Studios, London.

In 2013, she co-founded the Artraker Foundation along with International Conflict and Security (INCAS) Consulting and International Alert. The Artraker Foundation awards art that helps raise awareness, communicate, stimulate debate and transform our understanding of war, violent conflict and social upheaval. Madam President Marie-Louise Coleiro Preca, inaugurated the International Peace Exhibition held at Saint James Cavalier in 2017-18.  The Artraker Biennial Awards were extensively covered by The Guardian, Trebuchet Magazine, The Independent, BBC - Myanmar.

Education and personal life
Manali Jagtap completed her Masters (Distinction) in Art and Politics from Goldsmiths University, London and her graduation from the Sir J. J. School of Applied Arts, Mumbai, India.

She is separated from her husband David Nyheim, and they have two sons.

References

Living people
1978 births
People from Kolhapur